Carlos Alberto Olaivar Martinez de Murga (born 30 November 1988), known as Carli de Murga, is a professional footballer who plays as a centre back for Malaysian club Kelantan and the Philippines national team.

Club career

With Spanish clubs
Born in El Puerto de Santa María, Cádiz, Martínez de Murga was a youth graduate at hometown club Cádiz CF. He played with Cádiz B in the Tercera División during the 2008–09 season. He then moved to Atlético Sanluqueño during the 2009–10 season. He then signed for Racing Club Portuense for the 2010–11 season. In his stint for RC Portuense, he scored a goal in the 2–1 loss against P.D. Rociera.

Global F.C.
In January 2012, he signed up for Filipino side Global FC for the 2011–12 United Football League (UFL) season. He made his debut in the 2–1 win against Philippine Army. He scored his first goal in the 5–1 win against Manila Nomads. On 31 March 2012, he scored a hat trick against the Kaya that result in a 5–1 victory.

Ceres F.C.
De Murga was signed in by Ceres F.C. under a 3-year contract in February 2014. By the time of the signing de Murga was a free agent having previously played for Global. The footballer came from an anterior cruciate ligament on his right knee preventing him from playing football for five months. He debuted for Ceres at the 2014 United Football League Division 2 match against Manila Jeepney F.C. De Murga was used a substitute coming in for Angelo Marasigan in the 69th minute. Ceres won with the scoreline of 2–1.

De Murga helped Ceres win the 2014 UFL FA League Cup by defeating Global F.C. in the final played on 6 November 2014 with a scoreline of 2–1. However, Ceres was forced to make a substitution after de Murga sustained an injury on his left knee after colliding with a Global defender. The injury was later determined to be an ACL tear forcing de Murga out once again from competitive football for about a year and two months.

A surgery to treat his injury was unsuccessful and at one point during his recovery, de Murga's doctor hinted him that he should retire from football. De Murga refused to heed the advise and a second surgery proved to be successful.

In early 2016, de Murga was fielded in a friendly in Singapore. On 7 February 2016, he was later played against Loyola Meralco Sparks F.C. in Ceres' first 2016 UFL Cup match and scored a brace, marking his return in the UFL. Loyola scored the only other goal in the match that ended in a 2–1 win for Ceres.

He remained with Ceres, when it joined the Philippines Football League in 2017.

International career
Martínez de Murga discovered the Philippines team through a friend who was a Spanish league teammate of Philippines international Ángel Guirado. Through the social networking website Facebook, he was able to contact Guirado, together with his relatives, and was able to secure his requirements for him to suit up for the national team. De Murga’s mother Jacqueline Olaivar is from Quezon City, Philippines. She migrated to Spain in the 1980s and met her husband Antonio while they both worked in a supermarket there.

In September 2011, he joined the national team training pool and was named in the final 20-man squad for the 2011 Long Teng Cup and the provisional Philippines under-23 squad for the 2011 Southeast Asian Games. In the Long Teng Cup, he made his full international debut in the 3–3 draw against Hong Kong.

He made his first appearance for the under-23 national team in the 3–1 loss against Vietnam in the opening match of the 2011 Southeast Asian Games.

On 16 March 2012 in a semi-final match against Turkmenistan for the 2012 AFC Challenge Cup, he became a goalkeeper for the remainder of the second half injury time after Neil Etheridge was sent off from the field having received a straight red card.

On 12 June 2012, he scored his first international goal for the Philippines in a 3–0 win against Guam. He scored once again against Macau on 27 September 2012 in a 5–0 victory in the 2012 Philippine Peace Cup.

International goals
Scores and results list the Philippines' goal tally first.

Acting career
Murga started his acting career by starring in the music video for "Sometimes It Happens", a song entry for the second Philippine Popular Music Festival written by Adrienne Buenaventura & Niño Regalado and interpreted by Ace Libre of Never the Strangers.

Honours 
Johor Darul Ta'zim
 Piala Sumbangsih: 2022

References

1988 births
Living people
Footballers from Cádiz
Spanish people of Filipino descent
Spanish sportspeople of Asian descent
Citizens of the Philippines through descent
Spanish footballers
Filipino footballers
Filipino expatriate footballers
Association football midfielders
Association football fullbacks
Philippines international footballers
Cádiz CF players
Global Makati F.C. players
Ceres–Negros F.C. players
Terengganu FC players
Kelantan F.C. players
2019 AFC Asian Cup players